Quintavius Quirinius "Quentin" Quire, also known as Kid Omega, is a fictional character appearing in American comic books published by Marvel Comics, usually in those featuring the X-Men. Quire first appeared in New X-Men #134 (January, 2003). He was created by writer Grant Morrison and artist Frank Quitely.

Publication history
Quire made his first appearance in New X-Men #134 (Jan. 2003). His first appearance as Kid Omega and the first appearance of the Omega Gang were in New X-Men #135 (Feb. 2003). Grant Morrison has cited  The Sekhmet Hypothesis as an influence on the story as well as Quire's angry punk rock aesthetic, referring to it in their book, Supergods.

Fictional character biography

Xavier Institute
Quentin Quire joins the student body of the Xavier Institute after Professor X's return from averting a war with Genosha and the rebuilding of the X-Mansion. He immediately stands out as a brilliant intellect and quickly becomes Xavier's prize pupil. Xavier teaches Quire to control his powers when they first appear. The extent and type of his mutant abilities are never clearly defined. Quire appears to be a very powerful telepath, and the Stepford Cuckoos describe him as having a 'see-through mind', but he is not necessarily limited to that.

Quentin often associates with Glob Herman and has a crush on Sophie, one of the Stepford Cuckoos. However, something about Quire disturbs the Cuckoos, though Emma Frost dismisses it as academic rivalry.

Omega Gang: New X-Men
While a student at Xavier's, Quire invents the anti-gravity floats for Martha Johansson's brain canister, and exposes the charisma-powered Slick's true, ugly body to the other students. On his birthday, Quentin receives a call from his parents, who tell him he was adopted. This seems to destabilize him. He goes to town, getting a haircut reminiscent of Bolivar Trask's depiction of a mutant overlord from The Daily Bugle that was published the day Quire was born. Quire becomes strongly opposed to a policy of tolerance with humans, calling for vengeance for the recently murdered mutant designer Jumbo Carnation. He takes to wearing clothing based on the Trask mutant overlord illustration, which happens to be one of Jumbo's creations. He also debates with Professor X the merits of his dream of humans and mutants living in peace, and the school policies based on this idea. He questions whether Xavier would allow any dream other than his own to exist.

Shortly afterward, Quire and a group of like-minded students visit town wearing the Trask-overlord clothes, and Quire convinces them to take the mutant drug Kick. They accost a gang of humans in an alley and kill or maim them all. When Herman asks what had happened to a human Quentin himself had murdered, Quire replies he had carved his name across the man's mind. Back at school, Xavier confronts the students, but Quire is not implicated. Quire and his gang later go to a mutant tattooist and have their arms marked with an Omega symbol over an X, then attack U-Men Central. Returning to school, the "Omega Gang" ambushes Professor X with a baseball bat and clamps his head in a thought-proof helmet. The next day, at the school's "Open Day" to parents and the media, Quire publicly proclaims it is "open season on humans" and starts a riot.

"Riot at Xavier's"

Some of the students join Quire in protesting Xaviers' policies, but most of the damage is done by the Omegas themselves. They are finally subdued by Beast, Cyclops, Emma Frost and Xorn. However, with Quire still guarding Professor X, the situation threatens to continue. Quire even mentally subdues Wolverine with a memory of his past life. Xavier eventually frees himself of the helmet and confronts Quentin, calling his thought-proof helmet and his plans of revolution "flimsy". However, the altercation is not officially ended until the Stepford Cuckoos, led by Sophie, use Cerebra and a dose of mutant drug Kick to boost their shared powers. They blast through to the grounds and confront Quire, who confesses that his motivation for the ordeal was to impress Sophie, to whom he is attracted. This uniformly disgusts the Cuckoos, who mock his motivations and defeat him with a massive telepathic shockwave. Disoriented, Quentin apologizes. He confesses that he started everything not only because of his desire to impress Sophie, but also because of his own disrupted sense of identity upon discovering he was adopted.  Emma Frost chastises him for his recklessness, as she reveals the now deceased Sophie in her arms. After discovering this revelation and overloading on his own abilities, Quire immediately enters a catatonic state.

Quire is taken to the Infirmary, where Henry McCoy tries to stabilize him, but his body is being burnt out by his own psionic energy. This is apparently the result of his overdoses of Kick, which cause a secondary mutation that changes his brain into faster-than-light energy. Apparently this simultaneously puts him in telepathic contact with everyone on the planet across time. Seeing that Quire is terminal, Professor X calls for Xorn. He opens his helmet to expose Quire to the mini star in his head, and Quire "left the mortal plane". Quire's final words when Xorn "heals" him are vaguely prophetic of many of the coming events in Morrison's final run of New X-Men. This includes the foreshadowing of events such as Xorn later being revealed to be Magneto, Xorn's eventual destruction of Manhattan, and the actions of Sublime, a bacterial entity that claims to be the cause of some of the human/mutant hatred and aggression occurring. The incident forces the Professor to resign as headmaster, leaving Jean Grey to lead the school and X-Men.

"A Higher Plane of Existence"
However, Quire is not truly dead and Professor Xavier announces to the student body that he believes Quire has ascended to a higher plane of existence.  Quentin remains in a dormant, semi-alive, energy form in a containment unit on Beast's lab table. The potential future shown in the New X-Men story "Here Comes Tomorrow" indicated that Quentin is destined to become an avatar for the Phoenix Force. A young boy, wearing a Phoenix costume and Quentin's distinct pink haircut, is seen telling Jean Grey, who vaguely recognizes him, that she doesn't have long to set the events in the timeline right.

A few months later in X-Men: Phoenix – Endsong, when a fragment of the shattered Phoenix Force returns to Earth, it senses Quire and investigates him, thinking he might be Jean Grey. Though the Phoenix passes up Quire, it shocks him back to consciousness and he reconstitutes his body. Furthermore, he seeks out and reanimates Sophie's corpse, but is unable to complete the process, so he sets off to find the Phoenix Force so he can be with his love.  Quire finds the Phoenix, which has resurrected Jean Grey to attract Cyclops' attention, engaged in battle with the X-Men. Just prior to his arrival on the scene, the X-Men get the Phoenix to inhabit Emma Frost, Cyclops's current lover, and imprisons both her and Scott inside a containment vessel. Quire arrives and breaks the containment chamber open, releasing the Phoenix fragment. Quentin then asks the Phoenix to resurrect Sophie, which it does.  Sophie is still disgusted by him (and/or his actions) and chooses to return to death. Quire breaks down in anguish, and the Phoenix leaves him to his "sickness".  Having spent too much of his energy, Quire apologizes to the X-Men for his rash behavior and returns to his non-corporeal state in the container in Beast's lab.

Nation X
Beast brings Quentin's container to his lab on Utopia after the X-Mansion is abandoned.  Finding life on a higher plane to be "boring," Quentin revives himself and decides to become a villain and secretly destroy Utopia, claiming that the X-Men stole his idea to create a mutant nation. He elects to make his endeavor a game and selects Martha (a disembodied mutant brain with telepathic abilities living in a life support container) to be his nemesis, giving her seven and a half minutes to stop him. Martha attempts to alert the X-Men and locate Quentin, but he intercepts and taunts her at each attempt, ultimately smashing her container and leaving her to die.  Martha realizes that Quentin has infiltrated Cerebra in order to destroy the island and take revenge on the Stepford Cuckoos by putting them in a mental loop.  Martha breaks the Cuckoos free, and they quickly defeat Quire.

"Schism"
Quire returns in the X-Men arc "Schism", after being secretly broken out of the X-Men's prison by Kade Kilgore, the new Black King of the Hellfire Club. Thinking his containment unit just malfunctioned, Quire decides to celebrate his new freedom by infiltrating an international arms conference in Switzerland (where Scott Summers was to be giving a talk) and forcing the top leaders of the world to reveal their deepest, darkest secrets on camera. After this stunt, he becomes the most hunted mutant on Earth and seeks refuge on Utopia. Instead of handing him over to Captain Steve Rogers like Wolverine suggests, Cyclops orders that Quire be put back into containment so he can be tried by a jury of his peers after the trouble that Quire caused is resolved.

After the events of "Schism", Quire is considered one of the world's worst terrorists. Feeling that jail would only make Quentin's sociopathic tendencies worse, Wolverine strikes a deal with Captain America. He is released into Wolverine's custody and Quire is to attend the newly reformed Jean Grey Institute for Higher Learning in an effort to rehabilitate him. Nobody consulted Cyclops on this.

Wolverine and the X-Men
Quentin Quire is shown in promotional art for Wolverine and the X-Men #1 as a member of Wolverine's post-Schism team. In issue #3 of that series, Quire helps Wolverine's team by successfully reasoning with an offshoot of Krakoa. Later, while helping Wolverine con a "space casino" out of money needed for the school, Quire is able to manifest and use what he calls a "psychic shotgun," which is very similar to the psychic swords used by characters like Psylocke.

Quire faces off against Wolverine in a mental construct of his own devising in an attempt both to show Wolverine who is tougher and to punish him. This incident draws in Armor, a fellow student. Quire finds the effort extremely taxing to the point where he loses control of his own creation, leaving Wolverine's body a beastly, raging nightmare hellbent on killing Quentin. The limited series is titled Wolverine and the X-Men: Alpha & Omega, which is written by Brian Wood.

Over time, Quire begins to accept his fellow students by first helping them save the faculty after Frankenstein's Circus hypnotizes them against the student body, working as a team during a field trip to the Savage Land in which Wolverine's half-brother Dog Logan makes an unexpected appearance, and in A+X, he assists Captain America in a mission against an army of MODOK clones as part of his punishment for what he did at the UN conference in Switzerland.

During Infinity, Quire is chosen as one of the few students to represent Wolverine's school in a friendly competition among similar schools for super-youngsters. This 'Contest of Champions' is attacked by an alien armada. Quire witnesses fellow student Crimson being flattened right next to him. Ultimately, Quire's telepathy is essential in the other students joining to defeat an alien giant.

After several members of the Jean Grey School defected to join the new Hellfire Academy, Quentin followed them, hoping to discover why Idie Okonkwo switched sides. After gaining entrance to the Hellfire Academy, it was discovered that Quentin did not change allegiances but was looking for Idie. This led to Quentin getting "detention", in which he was beaten, until Toad helped him escape his tormentors. While trying to escape, Quentin and Toad were confronted by the other students of the academy. Together with Idie and Wolverine's X-Men, they defeat the Hellfire Academy and he returns to the school. Quentin later graduates and becomes a graduate student/assistant at the school. In Battle of the Atom, he comes face to face with his future Phoenix self and begins to question his stay at the school.

Due to his anger towards Logan and others, Quire later breaks off association with the facility when he becomes independently wealthy and leaves the school to join the Phoenix Corporation, later becoming the new White King of the Hellfire Club. However, he finds himself not quite able to enjoy the riches and fame because he saw his own death on a time travel adventure. Wolverine and Iron Man try to bring Quire out of his self-imposed isolation but fail. The events of AXIS and Wolverine's death cause him to finally return to the Jean Grey School and help both the Avengers and X-Men battle Red Onslaught.

Generation X
When Kitty Pryde relocated the X-Men in New York and the school was renamed to Xavier Institute for Mutant Education and Outreach, Quentin was forced to join in. He became part of Jubilee's team, which consisted of Nathaniel Carver, Benjamin Deeds, Lin Li, Bling! and Eye-Boy. When a mysterious shadow in Central Park started stealing mutants during the night, Quentin convinced his classmates to investigate. They found themselves face-to-face with Emplate, who was possessing his sister Monet's body at the time. After defeating the Rat King, Quentin convinced Benjamin and Nathaniel to join him for a night out. They were stuck in a villain-infested auction, where they had to destroy a priceless weapon, all without getting caught by the auctioneer, Kade Kilgore.

"The Phoenix"
Having become fed up with people, Quentin decided to exile himself from society and live in the middle of the Atlantic Ocean with Krakoa taking the shape of a small desert island. Quentin's little vacation was interrupted by Thor, who had been directed by Kid Gladiator and Warbird for help after a conflict with the Shi'ar escalated to a cosmic scale. Thor had been forced to compete against the Shi'ar gods K'ythri and Sharra in a contest to prove her godhood, and since they lost, the Shi'ar gods had conjured the Phoenix Force to have it lay waste to all of reality. Quentin psychically attacked the Phoenix, allowing Thor to access the White Hot Room and fight it. Quentin then used Thor's attacks as an opening to enter the White Hot Room himself and negotiate with the Phoenix. As a result of Quentin's proposition, the Phoenix allowed him to absorb a small portion of itself. In the end, K'ythri and Sharra were arrested and taken to Omnipotence City for their actions. As the Shi'ar were left without their gods, the newly Phoenix-empowered Quentin was proposed by Shadrak as a substitute to fill their role, and so became the New God of the Shi'ar as the Phoenix. This arrangement apparently didn't last, though, as Quentin appeared back on Earth and resumed his self-imposed exile on Krakoa. He ultimately sacrifice the Phoenix power to cure Jubilee back into a mutant.

Marvel Legacy
Kid Omega joined West Coast Avengers, under leaderships of both Hawkeyes, Clint Barton and Kate Bishop, to get financiers by starring in a reality show following their exploits. He also begin to have an awkward romance with Gwenpool.

During the "Empyre" storyline, Quentin Quire is among the psychic mutants that are summoned to Genosha. He is among those who witness Magik's fight with the Cotatinaught.

Powers and abilities
In New X-Men, Quire is depicted as an Omega level mutant possessing advanced cognitive and telepathic abilities that enable him to organize and construct his thoughts at accelerated rates, overtly or covertly manipulate the minds of others, resist mind probes, and disable other forms of psychic manipulation. His level of psychic influence on others depends on the number of individuals he wishes to affect — his influence is strongest among fewer individuals and subtler in large numbers of people.  Xavier explains that Quentin's psychic powers are "deep, subtle, and he's able to influence minds around him". Emma Frost also states that his mind processes several thousand "brilliant" thoughts a second. Given that Quire is under the influence of the drug Kick for much of his time at the academy, it is unknown how much his power was being boosted by its effects. However, after the events of "Schism", Quire is shown to have most of his telepathic and telekinetic powers still intact, even without Kick. His powers also seem to continue to develop, as Quire is able to manifest and use a "psychic shotgun", as well as other firearms and explosives, much in the same way other mutants (such as Psylocke) can manifest swords with their minds. He has also been shown to create an entire universe, which he calls "The Construct", within his mind, allowing him to imprison others within this world.

In the miniseries X-Men: Phoenix – Endsong, Quire generates massive amounts of telekinetic energy which manifest in the form of tentacles, allowing him to break free of his containment chamber, blast through the Xavier School's foundation, pull Sophie's body out of the ground, restructure it a bit, instantly heal wounds on his body inflicted through Wolverine's claws, and fly at supersonic speed.

Quentin Quire has existed without a body as a form of energy inside a jar. He is also depicted as being an alternate reality host of the Phoenix Force in the White Hot Room, suggesting that he can potentially be a host to the Phoenix. Quentin is apparently destined to become a Phoenix Avatar in more than one reality as further revealed by the Battle of the Atom storyline, where an alternate future version of Quire is a member of the future X-Men as well as a Phoenix avatar, having taken the codename "Phoenix".

Omega Gang
{{Infobox comics organization 
|name=Omega Gang
|image=
|publisher=Marvel Comics
|debut=New X-Men" #135
|creators=Grant MorrisonFrank Quitely
|base=Xavier Institute
|members=Glob HermanKid OmegaRadianRedneckTattoo
|subcat=Marvel Comics
|hero=
|villain=y
}}

The Omega Gang is a group of teenage mutants and enemies of the X-Men. Created by comics writer Grant Morrison, the gang first appears in New X-Men #135 but is not named until New X-Men #140, when Lucas Bishop asks to interview them.

The Omega Gang is formed by Quentin Quire, a young telepath and one of the top students of the Xavier Institute. Quire has become depressed because of an unrequited crush on Sophie of the Stepford Cuckoos; his unpopular status among the Institute students; and especially the revelation that he was an adopted child, which shatters his already fragile self-esteem. The death of mutant fashion designer Jumbo Carnation prompts Quire to gather a small group of students to exact revenge on Carnation's murderers.

At Quire's request, all members tattoo themselves with a symbol formed by an Omega with an X below it and dress up with red-and-black striped shirts, jeans and whips. This is an outfit designed by Carnation himself and based on an illustration from an anti-mutant article written by Bolivar Trask many years ago, which portrayed mutants enslaving the human race. The Omega Gang members also consume the drug Kick in order to boost their powers. Unbeknownst to them, the drug is actually the aerosol form of the sentient bacteria Sublime, which seeks to increase the violence between mutants and baseline humans.

The gang is responsible for the attack on a teenage anti-mutant gang and later for the Open Day Riots. During the riots, Professor X is injured and Dummy of the Special Class, a gas-composed mutant, is seemingly destroyed when his containment suit is pierced. The most notable victim is Sophie of the Stepford Cuckoos, who dies in her heroic attempt to stop Quentin. The rest of the Gang is stopped by the efforts of the other X-Men.

Other versions

Age of Apocalypse
In this harsh reality, it is revealed that Quentin was examined by the Shadow King and found to be an unstable, mildly talented telepath with apparently no usefulness to Weapon Omega. Quentin finds a way to create a kind of "psychic pyramid scheme" known as the Overmind by using minor "dreg" telepaths, the Mind Dolls, and uses this to increase his own limited skills, something the Shadow King didn't expected or even dreamed off. Sensing the boy's growing mental abilities, the Shadow King puts a bounty on him.

Prophet, leader of a group of human freedom fighters, and Jean Grey tries to recruit him as an ally, however he takes instead Jean Grey into the mindscape and tries to force her into unleashing the Phoenix Force so he could increase more his own mental abilities, unaware that Jean had become powerless and the Phoenix Force has left her. Jean quickly understands that Quentin is losing control over his powers and is falling into madness. She tries to help him but at the end, he dies by turning a gun on himself to bring peace to his fractured mind.

His suicide appeared to be a ruse as he was later seen alive and well with the Overmind. He confronts the Shadow King in his penthouse apartment, where the Shadow King managed to easily kill the Mind Dolls, yet he finds himself unable to defeat Quentin who reveals himself to be actually Goodnight in disguise. As it turns out, Prophet had secretly cloned Quentin's powerful mutant brain in order to be used to trap the Shadow King. Unable to navigate Quentin's labyrinth of a mind, the Shadow King was successfully taken off the board before the final battle against Weapon Omega.

Exiles
In Exiles: Days of Then and Now, Quentin Quire is one of the surviving heroes during the Annihilation Wave. It is led to Earth by a banished Hulk, who has killed Annihilus. Quentin leads a group that includes Lightspeed, Patriot, Speedball, Wiccan, and three of the Stepford Cuckoos: Sophie, Esme, and Mindee. Quentin has begun a relationship with Sophie, whose powers have changed to include limited precognition. After listening to Sophie's dream about a group of heroes that help restore order within damaged realities called the Exiles, Quentin goes on an interdimensional mission to find the original Exiles. Instead, he eventually recruits a group of heroes from the worlds he visits into a new group of Exiles. In the reality where he meets and recruits Nighthawk, he comes up against an alternate version of himself.

House of M
In the "House of M" storyline, Quentin, along with most of the New X-Men characters, appears as a student of the New Mutant Leadership Institute. Upon confronting the spying Wallflower and boasting that no one could stop his mind, Wallflower uses her pheromones to fill him with self-loathing, forcing him to commit mental suicide. In this version, Quentin retains his more clean-cut appearance.

Post-Graduation
An adult Quire is now host to the Phoenix Force. He returns to the now defunct Jean Grey School for Higher Learning to confront his nemesis, Wolverine. Backed up only by bamfs, Wolverine is confronted with Quire's newest surprise: two million Negative Zone mutants in need of schooling. However, Logan relishes his new-found role as teacher and welcomes them in.

Ultimate Marvel
Quentin Quire has recently appeared in the Ultimate Universe, offering comfort and mind therapy to Rogue, who has been traumatised over all she has seen and done. He is also featured as a mutant under the care of Nick Fury.

What If
An alternate version of Quentin briefly appears in the What If: Rise & Fall of the Shi'ar Empire one-shot. After Vulcan is transported into the White Hot Room, he tells Vulcan that he is not meant to be there. He is ultimately killed by Vulcan.

In other media
Film
A character called "Kid Omega" appears in the movie X-Men: The Last Stand, but is modeled after the character Quill rather than Quentin Quire. This was admitted as a typo in the commentary for the movie, where the character is instead referred to as "Quill". A character modeled after the character would later cameo in X-Men: Dark Phoenix.

Video games
 Kid Omega appears as playable character in Marvel Future Fight''.

References

Avengers (comics) characters
Comics characters introduced in 2002
Characters created by Frank Quitely
Characters created by Grant Morrison
Fictional avatars
Male characters in comics
Marvel Comics characters who have mental powers
Marvel Comics mutants
Marvel Comics superheroes
Marvel Comics supervillains 
Marvel Comics telekinetics
Marvel Comics telepaths